The Nihon L7P was a Japanese military seaplane built in World War II in the early 1940s.

Design
Initially, the project, called the Experimental 13-shi Small Transport, was designed with an all-metal airframe, but this was abandoned, restarting manufacture of the fuselage from metal and the wings from wood. The wing position was also raised to above the fuselage. The L7P was powered by two  Nakajima Kotobuki 41 radial engines.

Development
In 1938, the command of the Imperial Japanese Navy Air Service (IJNAS) issued specifications for a 13-shi Small Transport. The team of designers at Nihon Hikoki Kabushiki Kaisha (Nippi) under the leadership of Asahi Tsunashima designed the aircraft using the hull of the Fairchild XA-942B, which had been purchased in 1936 and used by the IJNAS as the LXF1. 

Due to the workload of the company working on the design of the Nippi K8Nil (12-shi Experimental Training Seaplane), work on the L7P progressed slowly, but the first prototype was ready in February 1942. The tests that took place at the 1st Maritime Aviation Arsenal in Kamisaguri were unsuccessful revealing the poor characteristics of the aircraft. The IJNAS rejected the L7P, as the requirements for this type of aircraft changed. The second prototype of the aircraft remained unfinished and was dismantled for scrap.

Specifications

References

Aircraft first flown in 1942
High-wing aircraft
Twin piston-engined tractor aircraft
1940s Japanese military transport aircraft